Frank Henderson may refer to:

Frank Henderson (cricketer) (1908–1954), Australian cricketer
Frank Henderson (poker player) (born 1931), American poker player
Frank Henderson (public servant) (1911–1969), Australian public servant
Frank Henderson (Scottish politician) (1836–1889), Scottish Liberal politician
Frank Henderson (South Dakota politician) (1928–2012), American politician from South Dakota
Frank Henderson (Idaho politician) (1922–2015), Republican Idaho state representative
Frank Henderson (footballer) (1900–1966), English football left half
Frank Henderson (Irish revolutionary) (1886–1959), captain in the Irish Volunteers